Birkenes Idrettslag is a Norwegian sports club from Birkeland, Aust-Agder. It has sections for association football, team handball, volleyball, cycling, track and field, orienteering, biathlon, and Nordic skiing.

It is known for its biathletes. Gunn Margit Andreassen represented the club, so does Lars Helge Birkeland. Cyclist Dag Erik Pedersen also represented the club.

The men's football team played in the Third Division, the fourth tier of Norwegian football, in 1998. It currently resides in the Fifith Division.

References

External links
Official site 

Football clubs in Norway
Association football clubs established in 1924
Sport in Aust-Agder
Birkenes
Athletics clubs in Norway
1924 establishments in Norway